Daniel "Daan" van Dijk (10 May 1907 – 22 November 1986) was a Dutch track cyclist who competed in the 1928 Summer Olympics. He won the gold medal in the tandem event together with Bernhard Leene.

See also
 List of Dutch Olympic cyclists

References

External links

1907 births
1986 deaths
Cyclists from The Hague
Dutch male cyclists
Olympic cyclists of the Netherlands
Cyclists at the 1928 Summer Olympics
Olympic gold medalists for the Netherlands
Olympic medalists in cycling
Medalists at the 1928 Summer Olympics
Dutch track cyclists
20th-century Dutch people